Deiveega Raagangal is a 1980 Indian Tamil-language film written and directed by A. Veerappan. The film stars Srikanth, Roja Ramani, Vadivukkarasi. It was released on 29 February 1980.

Plot

Cast 
 Srikanth
 Vadivukkarasi
Roja Ramani
 Priyavadhana
 Leela
Suruli Rajan

Production 
Deiveega Raagangal was directed by A. Veerappan, who also wrote the screenplay. It was produced by Aachi Cine Arts.

Soundtrack 
The soundtrack was composed by M. S. Viswanathan.

References

External links 
 

1980s Tamil-language films
Films scored by M. S. Viswanathan